Brent Bradley Knackert (born August 1, 1969) is a former pitcher in Major League Baseball who played for the Seattle Mariners (1990) and Boston Red Sox (1996). Listed at 6' 3", 185 lb., he batted and threw right-handed.

In a two-season career, Knackert posted a 1-2 record with 33 strikeouts and a 7.04 ERA in 32 appearances, including two starts and 47⅓ innings of work.

External links
Career statistics and player information from Baseball Reference or Baseball Reference (Minors)
Retrosheet
The Baseball Gauge
Venezuela Winter League

1969 births
Living people
Baseball players from Los Angeles
Binghamton Mets players
Boston Red Sox players
Gulf Coast White Sox players
Jacksonville Suns players
Leones del Caracas players
American expatriate baseball players in Venezuela
Major League Baseball pitchers
Pawtucket Red Sox players
San Bernardino Spirit players
Sarasota White Sox players
Seattle Mariners players
Tampa White Sox players
Trenton Thunder players